This is a List of members of the 2009–2017 Lebanese Parliament.

See also 
 2009 Lebanese general election
 Members of the 2005–2009 Lebanese Parliament

2009 in Lebanon
2010 in Lebanon
2011 in Lebanon
2012 in Lebanon
2013 in Lebanon
2009